Nihonia mirabilis, the remarkable turrid, is a species of sea snail, a marine gastropod mollusk in the family Cochlespiridae.

Description
The length of the shell attains 90 mm, its diameter 24 mm. The buff shell has an elongate-fusiform shape. It shows broad, reddish-brown longitudinal flames. The long siphonal canal is straight and unnotched, showing primary and secondary spirals. The shell contains  moderately convex whorls, including  smooth whorls in the protoconch. The spîral sculpture shows prominent spiral cords and numerous interstitial spiral threads. The axial sculpture shows many weak growth lines. The body whorl contains twelve primary spiral cords and measures ⅔ of the total length of the shell. The thin outer lip is arcuately produced. The aperture is oblong and ovate.

Distribution
This marine species occurs off Japan.

References

 Hirase (1934), A Collection of Japanese Shells, li. 115, fig. 12
 Otuka (1959), Venus, vol. 20, pt. 3, p. 245, fig. 2

External links

mirabilis
Gastropods described in 1914